Lady Jin (金氏, personal name unknown) was the second known wife of Wang Yanjun, a ruler of the Chinese Five Dynasties and Ten Kingdoms period state Min.

Very little was recorded in written history about her.  Indeed, while her family name was given as Jin in the New History of the Five Dynasties and the Spring and Autumn Annals of the Ten Kingdoms, both the Spring and Autumn Annals of the Ten Kingdoms and the Zizhi Tongjian also inconsistently gave her family name as Liu, the same as his first wife Liu Hua.

As Lady Liu died in 930, Lady Jin would have married Wang Yanjun sometime thereafter, while he would have carried the title of Prince of Min as a nominal vassal to Later Tang.  Lady Jin was described to be virtuous, but not favored by Wang Yanjun.  After he declared himself as Emperor of Min, independent of Later Tang, in 933, he was not initially described to have created anyone empress.  However, as he came to favor his concubine Consort Chen Jinfeng, in 935 he created Consort Chen empress, bypassing Lady Jin.  It was said that particularly after Empress Chen's creation, Lady Jin lost whatever remaining favor she had, and nothing further was known about what happened to her.

Notes and references

External links 
 Spring and Autumn Annals of the Ten Kingdoms, vol. 94.
 Zizhi Tongjian, vol. 279.

Min Kingdom people
10th-century deaths
Year of birth unknown

zh:金皇后 (王延鈞)